The following is a list of characters that first appeared in the BBC soap opera EastEnders in 1992, by order of first appearance.

Christine Hewitt

Christine Hewitt, played by Elizabeth Power, is introduced in 1992 as a lonely divorcée who becomes besotted with married Arthur Fowler (Bill Treacher) while he tends her garden. She leaves in 1993 once her affair with Arthur is discovered by his wife Pauline Fowler (Wendy Richard). Liz Power was offered the role by one of the programme's producers, Leonard Lewis, for whom she'd worked with previously on Juliet Bravo and Softly, Softly. She has commented "I got a call out of the blue asking if I could go up to the BBC at Elstree to meet him. Mrs Hewitt was going to be in five episodes and I thought, 'wonderful'." Mrs Hewitt makes her first appearance on-screen in February 1992, as a lonely divorcee who employs the long-running character, Arthur Fowler, to tend to her garden—used as a plot device to rebuild Arthur's relationship with his son Mark Fowler (Todd Carty), while they work together on Christine's garden. Power filmed her scenes for the five episodes and thought that would be the end of it; however, she was subsequently contacted by Leonard Lewis and asked to reprise the role. Power commented "It was all I could do to stop myself screeching down the phone. They didn't tell me which direction the story was going to take. I got on so well with [Bill Treacher] from the word go. We really liked each other." Mrs Hewitt is reintroduced in a storyline that sees her become Arthur Fowler's mistress, but when the affair ended Power left the series, making her final appearance on-screen in October 1993.

Anne Howes

Anne Howes, played by Cassie Stuart, meets Phil Mitchell (Steve McFadden) while he is on a stag night in a curry house. Phil brings her back to his home at The Queen Victoria public house and they have sex. A romance is quick to develop, but Anne turns out to be a habitual liar. She refuses to give Phil her home telephone number or allow him back to her house and when Phil questions her on this, she becomes defensive and hostile. By this time Phil has fallen for her, so he perseveres, but he begins to grow suspicious when he spots her arguing with a strange man in the middle of Bridge Street market. Anne claims that the man was merely an ex-boyfriend, but when Phil confronts him he is told that Anne is his wife and a serial adulterer.

Phil is angered by her dishonesty, but Anne claims that her marriage is over, which her husband, Terry (Neal Swettenham), refuses to accept. She portrays Terry as suicidal and needy and promises that her feelings for Phil are genuine. Phil eventually accepts her explanation and confesses to loving her, but Anne remains uncertain about leaving her husband, fearing that he will kill himself if she does. After days of ignoring Phil, Anne agrees to discuss their relationship over dinner, but she arrives at the restaurant late, claiming that her husband had locked her in their bedroom. Terry follows them there and is shocked to discover that Anne had claimed he was suicidal, dismissing this as one of her lies. He pleads with Phil to finish with Anne for the sake of their young daughter – another secret that Anne has been keeping. Phil ends the affair after realising that Anne has been lying to him all along.

Mandy Salter

Mandy Salter, played by Nicola Stapleton, is introduced on 12 March 1992, and portrayed as a teenage tearaway. She is featured in storylines about homelessness, child and drug abuse. Her relationship with Aidan Brosnan (Sean Maguire) is one of the prominent storylines featured in 1993. Due to the character's devious behaviour, it has been suggested that Mandy was one of the most hated characters on television during her tenure. Mandy was one of several introductions to the cast of EastEnders in 1992. Executive producer Leonard Lewis took a tentative approach to introducing new characters in 1992. Most were introduced gradually, making an initial appearance and then joining the programme full-time a couple of months later. This allowed the producers and writers to create new characters and see them brought to life by the actors before committing them to a longer contract. Mandy first appears in March 1992 as a school girl aged 15, abandoned by her mother in Pat Butcher's care. She left the series temporarily a few weeks later; in the storyline she goes back to her mother's flat, but she returns by the summer of 1992 as a regular character, squatting in the soap's setting of Albert Square. Stapleton quit the role and Mandy departs on-screen on 13 January 1994.

Stapleton claimed that she has been asked to reprise the role at various times, and although she turned these offers down, in 2009 she stated the door has been left open for Mandy to return. In June 2011, it was confirmed that Stapleton was to reprise her role as Mandy and she reappears from 29 August 2011.

In her return storyline, Mandy is found working as a lap dancer by Ian Beale (Adam Woodyatt), who offers her a place to stay back in Walford, and they begin a relationship. However it is also revealed that Mandy became pregnant with Ricky Butcher's (Sid Owen) child just before she left Walford in 1994, and gave birth to a premature daughter, Kira, who died shortly after birth. Mandy and Ian make plans to marry, but on their wedding day she refuses to marry him, revealing that she has been forcing herself to love him. Ian begs her to stay but Mandy leaves Walford again.

Nigel Bates

Nigel Bates, played by Paul Bradley, was introduced in 1992 by Leonard Lewis, the character was incorporated gradually and brought back as a regular following a brief stint due to a popular reception. He is depicted as a lovable loser and a nerd. Bradley quit the role and Nigel was written out of the serial in April 1998 and was given a happy ending. The door was left open for a possible future return. Nigel was one of several introductions occurring in 1992. Executive producer Leonard Lewis took a tentative approach to introducing new characters in 1992. Most were introduced gradually, making an initial appearance and then joining the programme full-time a couple of months later. This allowed the producers and writers to create new characters and see them brought to life by the actors before committing them to a longer contract. Characters introduced in this way included Mandy Salter (Nicola Stapleton) and Christine Hewitt (Lizzie Power).

Terry Howes

Terry Howes, played by Neal Swettenham, is the estranged husband of Phil Mitchell's (Steve McFadden) girlfriend, Anne (Cassie Stuart), although this is not revealed straight away. Originally Anne claims that Terry is a former lover, who has taken their separation badly. Phil becomes suspicious when he sees Anne and Terry rowing and, later that evening, Terry is spotted lurking outside Phil's house. Furious, Phil tries to warn him off, but Terry stuns him by revealing that he and Anne are actually married.

Anne convinces Phil that her marriage is over, but she is unable to leave Terry as he had threatened to kill himself if she did. When Phil confronts Terry with this, he discovers that Anne has been lying – she'd had numerous affairs in the past, but always came back to him in the end. Terry then shocks Phil by telling him that he and Anne have a young daughter. He begs him to end the affair for her sake. Phil does so after realising that Anne had been lying all along.

Gary Phillips

Gary Phillips, played by Scott Lane, is a friend of Lloyd Tavernier (Garey Bridges). He and his friend Wesley are into shoplifting and raiding skips and repossessed houses for discarded junk, which they sell on Brick Lane.

On one occasion, Gary steals a car and takes it for a joyride with Lloyd and Wes. His unruly driving catches the attention of the police and a chase ensues. The police eventually corner them and all three are arrested and charged.

They stand trial in front of a magistrate in April and Gary is sent to a young offenders institute for a three-month sentence. He is also disqualified from driving for two years. Lloyd manages to get off with a suspended sentence because he has sickle cell disease.

Jonathan Hewitt

Jonathan Hewitt, played by Jonny Lee Miller, is the layabout son of Christine Hewitt (Elizabeth Power) – who employs Arthur Fowler (Bill Treacher) to tend to her garden. Jonathan has been unemployed for a while after dropping out of college, and when Christine sees Arthur advertising for a gardening assistant she approaches him and recommends Jonathan for the post. Arthur agrees and he and Jonathan spend several weeks tending to gardens in Albert Square.

Arthur's love for plants rubs off on Jonathan, and he seems extremely keen on the job, even helping Arthur sell his plants at the May Day fête on the Square. However, as the weeks go by Jonathan starts to shirk his responsibilities, leaving work early and then failing to show up at all. After a few days of absence, Arthur contacts Christine to complain. According to Christine, Jonathan has left London to attend a festival in Scotland with his hippy friends. Christine takes over the job in his place, which is the precursor to her affair with Arthur. Jonathan never appears again, but in March 1993 Christine visits him in Scotland because he has suffered an injury.

The role of Jonathan Hewitt was one of the first notable acting credits for Jonny Lee Miller, who went on to find greater fame as a film actor. Miller has since commented on his stint in EastEnders: "It was five weeks' work and I made more money there than I ever had in my life. Then they offered me a year's contract. I said no, thank God. I thought I should get out of there while I still could. No offence to EastEnders."

Mr Papadopolous

Andonis Papadopolous, played by Lee Warner and known commonly as Mr Papadopolous, is the owner of the launderette on Bridge Street. In a long-running joke, employee Dot Branning (June Brown) has difficulty pronouncing his surname, and for much of the show's history he has been referred to as Mr. Oppodopolus, Oppydoppy, Olopolopous or varying other mispronunciations; some of these are used by other characters, including Yolande Trueman (Angela Wynter) who calls him Mr. P. Andonis. He is not the original owner of the launderette. From the show's inception until May 1992 the property is owned by his father, until he dies while holidaying in his native Athens. The character is of Greek descent, but the Papadopouloses are apparently based in Walthamstow, East London. Andonis makes his first appearance in May 1992, when he comes to Walford to assess the business following his father's death. Dot notices him taking a keen interest in the launderette and fears he is a murderer. She spends several days in a terrified state until Andonis makes a formal introduction the following episode, revealing his first name. He makes several alterations to the way the business is managed, much to Dot's dismay.

Over the next two years he shows up in Walford occasionally. He is featured in the programme's 1,000th episode on 12 July 1994, discovering that his employee Carol Jackson (Lindsey Coulson) is faking an illness to get out of work when he sees her attending the wedding of Nigel (Paul Bradley) and Debbie Bates (Nicola Duffett). The following day he fires Carol, as well as long-time employee Pauline Fowler (Wendy Richard), who had been covering up for her. He employs a relative to work in their place, but the launderette falls into chaos, so both are eventually offered their jobs back. Pauline makes him grovel before accepting and manages to get a 75-pence-per-hour payrise. He returned on 10 August 2009, although his face is not seen on screen, he does not speak and he is not named in the credits. He arrives at the launderette looking for Dot, and later finds her at her house, giving her a parcel. In 2012, Mr. Papadopolous' nephew, Nico Papadopoulos (Aykut Hilmi), makes an appearance as the manager of McKlunky's, a local fast food restaurant. In 2016, it is mentioned that he has passed the launderette on to his son, Apostolos Papadopolous (Tarrick Benham).

Richard Cole

Richard Cole, played by Ian Reddington between 1992 and 1994, is a character was conceived by writer Tony Jordan. Designed to be "a bit of a lad, a charming womaniser", the original character's biography scripted him with as a uniform-wearing Cockney from London. However, when Sheffield-born actor Ian Reddington read for the role, the production team liked his portrayal so much that they altered the character's backstory so they could accommodate Reddington's Northern-English accent. The character was nicknamed "Tricky Dicky" both in the show and the British press and became a prominent soap womaniser and villain for the two years he appeared; he has flings with various female characters, most notably Kathy Beale (Gillian Taylforth) and Bianca Jackson (Patsy Palmer).

Adrian Bell

Adrian Bell, played by Joseph Marcell, appears in episodes 782 and 783, first broadcast on 4 and 6 August 1992 respectively. He is introduced as an acquaintance of Grant Mitchell (Ross Kemp).

Adrian is called urgently to The Queen Victoria public house in August 1992 to do some repair work on its furniture, after Grant had smashed the place up during a heated row with his wife, Sharon Mitchell (Letitia Dean). Adrian spends several days mending the furniture, though Sharon finds his presence an irritation, as he makes loud noises and takes up room in her bar. She is pleased with the job he does in the end, and is more than happy with his reasonable fee. Frank Butcher (Mike Reid) also tries to employ Adrian to install a cab office for his wife's cab firm in Bridge Street café. He wants to relocate the office from its current location at the car lot, where he works. When Frank's wife, Pat Butcher (Pam St. Clement), finds out, she forbids Frank from going ahead with the plan.

Lilian Kominski

Lilian Kominski, played by Anna Korwin, is the mother of Rachel Kominski (Jacquetta May). She comes to stay with Rachel unexpectedly following a row with her husband, Joseph, and she refuses to return home until her husband begs her to. Lilian is an interfering, judgemental and critical person, who constantly upsets and embarrasses Rachel in front of her friends. She jibes Rachel for not dressing attractively or having a husband; criticises her lifestyle; meddles in her blossoming relationship with Richard Cole (Ian Reddington); frowns upon Rachel's lodger, Michelle Fowler (Susan Tully), for having an interracial relationship with Clyde Tavernier (Steven Woodcock); and tells anyone who cares to listen about how badly Rachel treats her and how much she has sacrificed for her. Rachel finds her presence highly stressful, but whenever she confronts her mother, Lilian gets upset, so Rachel is forced to backtrack to spare her feelings.

Lilian begins dropping hints about Rachel's past in passing conversations to her friends, indicating that she had always been forced to clear up Rachel's many mistakes. She depicts Rachel as a troubled and depressed child, and seems keen to divulge the reasons why. Rachel is furious when Michelle tells her that Lilian has been dropping hints about her secret past. She confronts her mother and it transpires that Rachel had fallen pregnant at 14, and Lilian had forced her to have an abortion, which left her depressed for a long while after. Rachel tells her mother that she resents her for forcing her into an abortion. This upsets Lilian and she tells Rachel that it broke her heart to lose her first and perhaps only grandchild, but there was no other option. Rachel fears that Lilian will divulge her secret if she stays in Walford, so she orders her mother to go back to her father. Lilian leaves the following day after making peace with Rachel.

Shelley Lewis

Shelley Lewis, played by Nicole Arumugam, is a college friend of Michelle Fowler (Susan Tully), and is first seen in November 1992. When Michelle's housemate, Rachel Kominski (Jacquetta May), leaves Walford early in 1993, Shelley moves in with Michelle and her daughter Vicki Fowler (Samantha Leigh Martin) at 55 Victoria Road. She later gets a job as a part-time barmaid in The Queen Victoria pub, and is often seen hanging around with her other student pals Rich and her on/off boyfriend Clem (Jason Yates), which causes problems with Michelle when are caught smoking cannabis in front of Vicki.

Shelley initially sets her sights on Michelle's brother, Mark Fowler (Todd Carty). Both appeared smitten with each other, but Mark is harbouring a secret – he is HIV positive. Seeing them growing closer, Michelle tells Mark that he has to cool things with Shelley or tell her the truth. Mark then decides that it is best that they just remain friends.

Shelley is a bit of a user and after her brief fling with Mark ends she set her sights on local sleaze, Richard Cole (Ian Reddington), thinking he'd be a good 'meal ticket'. Richard is happy to lavish Shelley with expensive gifts in the hope that they will coax her into having sex with him. Shelley is happy to take the gifts, but when Richard begins to seek a return from his investments, Shelley abruptly tells him that she 'wouldn't touch him with a bargepole'.

Shelley is still attracted to Mark and later initiates a kiss, reigniting their romance. In November that year, they (along with Michelle and Clem) go on a trip to Amsterdam. Shelley is still dating Clem, so she and Mark sneak away to be together at any opportunity. They eventually manage to give Clem and Michelle the slip and end up back at their hotel. Shelley makes her amorous intentions clear, but Mark seems hesitant and ends up walking out. A confused Shelley follows him and berates him for leading her on. Mark is finally forced to divulge that the reason he cannot have sex with her was because he is HIV positive. Shelley is furious with him for not trusting her enough to tell her in the first place and tells him she never wants to see him again.

Mark takes the rejection badly and he begins neglecting his health by not taking his HIV medication. During Christmas that year, he is rushed to hospital after collapsing. When Shelley finds out that Mark is ill, she rushes to him and confesses that she really cares for him and so they reignite their relationship. Shelley is desperate for Mark to meet her family and go on holiday with her parents. She becomes slightly infatuated with him and tries to spend as much time with him as she can. Mark feels that the relationship is moving too quickly and soon begins to tire of Shelley.

By March 1994, Mark decides to end the relationship but when he tries to break it off, Shelley resorts to emotional blackmail and says that if he left her, she would fail her exams. When this doesn't work, she resorts to begging, crying and emotional pressure, saying that she has risked her health being with him, so he owes her. After one final irrational outburst – where she almost publicly reveals that Mark is HIV positive – Shelley finally realises that the relationship is over and decides to leave Walford in March 1994.

Shelley makes one final appearance in December 1994, when she and Michelle attend their university graduation ceremony. Shelley is there with her fiancé, and has found herself a job with a publisher who plays golf with her fiancé's father. Shelley sees Mark and all their past animosity has been forgotten, although Mark's new girlfriend, Ruth Aitken (Caroline Paterson), is a little jealous of her.

Jack Woodman

Jack Woodman, played by James Gilbey, first appears in November 1992 as a student friend of Michelle Fowler (Susan Tully). Michelle goes to a student gig on campus and spends the night being chatted up by Jack. Unbeknown to Michelle, her boyfriend, Clyde Tavernier (Steven Woodcock), follows her there and finds her in bed with Jack, which ends their relationship.

Jack reappears in December 1992 when he arrives unexpectedly at the Fowler house on Christmas Day, to visit Michelle. Jack soon reveals that he wants to continue his fling with Michelle, although she is adverse to this and gently but firmly declines. Jack is not perturbed and he continuously shows up in Walford with various different excuses in a bid to get close to Michelle. He secretly takes photos of her; arranges to be privately home tutored by her landlady Rachel Kominski (Jacquetta May) and interferes with her lingerie; has numerous fights with Clyde; begins to spend time with her mother Pauline (Wendy Richard) so he can pry into Michelle's private life and then smashes his head against a brick wall and turns up at Michelle's looking for sympathy.

When Michelle's daughter, Vicki Fowler (Samantha Leigh Martin), is kidnapped in March 1993, Jack becomes prime suspect in the police investigation. When the police question him and discover that his room is littered with pictures of Michelle, they decide to keep him under surveillance. The real kidnapper is eventually caught, but Jack is furious with Michelle's betrayal. He continues to stalk her until she decides to take action. She enlists the help of Phil Mitchell (Steve McFadden) to scare him away and when this fails she contacted Jack's father (Peter Kelly) and stepmother (Helen Blizard) to confront them with his irrational behaviour. It is revealed that Jack has a history of stalking girls and, after Jack breaks down and confesses to everything, his father takes him home with him.

Donald Cameron

Donald Cameron, played by Robert Wilson, is a blind, Scottish ex-army sergeant who helped Dot Cotton (June Brown) with her Christmas carol concert in December 1992, by playing the piano. His fee is a bottle of malt whisky, provided by Nigel Bates (Paul Bradley). Ethel Skinner (Gretchen Franklin) also thinks he is attractive, and jokes with Dot about telling him that she has the body of a young woman, due to his blindness.

Others

References

1992
, EastEnders
EastEnders